John Stewart Wright (1890 – 1956) was a Scottish footballer who played for Morton as a centre half, making over 400 appearances for the club between 1911 and 1925. He was also the club's manager in two spells, between 1927 and 1929, and 1934 and 1939.

He initially played for hometown club Port Glasgow Athletic Juniors, and was selected twice for Scotland at that level in 1910 before moving up to the senior leagues with Morton. A large part of his career was interrupted by World War I (during which the club won the War Fund Shield in 1915 and were finalists in 1918. After the resumption of regular competitions he was in the team which claimed the Scottish Cup in 1922, the only major honour in Morton's history.

Wright was selected four times for the Scottish Football League XI and appeared in three wartime internationals, but never gained a full official cap for Scotland.

See also
List of one-club men in association football

References

1890 births
Date of birth missing
1956 deaths
Date of death missing
Scottish footballers
Scottish football managers
People from Port Glasgow
Footballers from Inverclyde
Association football central defenders
Scottish Junior Football Association players
Scotland junior international footballers
Port Glasgow Athletic Juniors F.C. players
Greenock Morton F.C. players
Greenock Morton F.C. managers
Scottish Football League players
Scottish Football League representative players
Scotland wartime international footballers
Scottish Football League managers